Austefjord Church is a parish church of the Church of Norway in the municipality of Volda in Møre og Romsdal county, Norway. It is located in the village of Fyrde, at the eastern end of the Austefjorden. It is the church for the Austefjord parish which is part of the Søre Sunnmøre prosti (deanery) in the Diocese of Møre. The white, wooden church was built in a long church design in 1879 using plans drawn up by an unknown architect. The church seats about 150 people.

History
The church was originally built in 1773 (some sources say 1766) in the village of Nes in the former municipality of Bjugn, where it was known as Nes Church. The church was then disassembled and moved from Nes to the village of Fyrde. It was reassembled there and renamed Austefjord Chapel (it was later renamed as a church). The builder was Gjert Lien from Nordfjord. The new church was completed and put into use in November 1879. The building was consecrated on 1 July 1880 by the local parish priest Lars Gledistch. Originally, the church was painted red, but later this was changed to white.

Media gallery

See also
List of churches in Møre

References

Volda
Churches in Møre og Romsdal
Wooden churches in Norway
Long churches in Norway
18th-century Church of Norway church buildings
Churches completed in 1773
1879 establishments in Norway